Robert Jackson Coulson (June 17, 1887 – September 11, 1953) is a former Major League Baseball and Federal League outfielder. He played ball in four seasons, which spanned 7 years. In the Majors, he played for the Cincinnati Reds and Brooklyn Superbas. In his one season in the Federal League, 1914, he played for the Pittsburgh Rebels. He also attended Penn State University.

On August 4, 1908, at the age of 21, Coulson made his Major League debut with the Reds. In 18 at-bats in his rookie year, he batted .333 (which would end up being the highest batting average in his career). In 1911, Coulson had a career year. Although he hit only .234 and led the league in strikeouts with 78, he stole 32 bases and collected 7 triples. He also had career highs in every major category except home runs. In 1914, 3 years after his last game in the Majors, Coulson played 18 games for the Federal League's Rebels. He had a batting average of .203.

Overall, Coulson had one career home run (in 1910), 43 stolen bases, and a .236 career batting average. Statistically, according to Baseball Reference, he is most similar to Karl Olson. Fielding, Coulson had a .961 career fielding percentage.

Coulson played his final game on July 3, 1914. He died in Washington, Pennsylvania on September 11, 1953 and was laid to rest in Beallsville Cemetery in Beallsville, Pennsylvania.

References

 Bob Coulson stats on Baseball Almanac

1887 births
1953 deaths
Cincinnati Reds players
Brooklyn Superbas players
Brooklyn Dodgers players
Pittsburgh Rebels players
Major League Baseball outfielders
Baseball players from Pennsylvania
Pennsylvania State University alumni
Memphis Turtles players
Altoona Rams players
Kansas City Blues (baseball) players
Newark Indians players
Portland Beavers players
Penn State Nittany Lions baseball players
People from Washington County, Pennsylvania